Archontophoenix alexandrae, commonly known as Alexandra palm, king palm, Northern Bangalow palm, or feather palm, is a palm endemic to Queensland, Australia. It was named in honour of Princess Alexandra of Denmark, but is often erroneously referred to by the misnomer Alexander palm.

Description

Flowers

The inflorescence of Archontophoenix alexandrae is a panicle, creamy white when first released from the protective sheath or prophyll that it develops within, and transitioning through light green as the fruits develop and finally to brown when it is shed from the tree. Flowering occurs randomly throughout the year, and it is not uncommon to find a group of these palms, some of which carry fruit and/or flowers while others carry neither.

Fruit
The fruits are ovoid to globose with a persistent calyx. They are initially green turning bright red when ripe.

Taxonomy
The species was originally described as Ptychosperma alexandrae by Ferdinand von Mueller in his Fragmenta phytographiae Australiae in 1865. In 1875 the German botanists Hermann Wendland and Oscar Drude published a treatment of Australian palms in the journal Linnaea titled Palmae Australasicae, in which this species was renamed Archontophoenix alexandrae.

Etymology
The genus name is derived from the Ancient Greek ἄρχων (árkhōn), meaning "chieftain" or "ruler", combined with the palm genus Phoenix, and refers to the regal stature of the trees. The species epithet is given in honour of Princess Alexandra of Denmark.

Distribution and habitat

The native range of this species is north-east and central-east Queensland, from the Melville Range in Cape York Peninsula to south of Gladstone. Their ability to withstand these conditions allow them to become the dominant species.

Ecology
The fruit of the Alexandra palm is eaten by many bird species, notably the Metallic starling (Aplonis metallica), which often descend on a tree as a flock and may consume all of the ripe fruits within an hour. Other common bird species include the Torresian imperial pigeon (Ducula spilorrhoa) and the Wompoo fruit dove (Ptilinopus magnificus). Fruits are also eaten by fruit bats and the Musky rat-kangaroo (Hypsiprymnodon moschatus).

Uses
The Kuku Yalanji people of Far North Queensland would eat the palm heart of this species.

Cultivation
This species is easily grown from fresh seed, and is very popular in cultivation in Australia, both for private gardens and as a street and park tree. It is fast growing and will tolerate cooler climates outside the tropics where there are no frosts, and has been widely planted in many countries. It has become naturalised in Hawaii.

Gallery

See also 
List of Australian plant species authored by Ferdinand von Mueller

References

External links
 
 
 Map of occurrences of Archontophoenix alexandrae at the Atlas of Living Australia
 See images of Archontophoenix alexandrae on Flickriver

alexandrae
Trees of Australia
Palms of Australia
Ornamental trees
Flora of Hawaii
Plants described in 1875
Taxa named by Ferdinand von Mueller
Taxa described in 1865
Endemic flora of Queensland